Sahi Ram is an Indian politician and  a member of the Sixth Legislative Assembly of Delhi and re-elected to Seventh Legislative Assembly of Delhi in India. He represents the Tughlakabad constituency of Delhi and is a member of the  Aam Aadmi Party political party. He won from Tughlakabad Assembly on an Aam Aadmi Party Ticket in the year 2015 & 2020.

Early life and  education
Sahi Ram was born in Delhi on 10 October 1959. He was brought up in Tekhand Village, Delhi. He attended the Government Boys Senior Secondary School in Badarpur and was educated to tenth grade. He is from Bidhuri clan of Gurjar Community.

Political  career
Sahi Ram is a Second Term  MLA , representing the Tughlakabad constituency in the Sixth and Seventh Delhi Legislative Assembly. He is a member of the Aam Aadmi  Party.

In 2013, Sahi Ram was elected as Deputy Mayor from South Delhi Municipal Corporation. Also he was elected as two times Councillor.

Posts held

Electoral performance

References 
 

1959 births
Aam Aadmi Party politicians from Delhi
Living people
People from Delhi
Delhi MLAs 2015–2020
Delhi MLAs 2020–2025
Indian politicians convicted of crimes